is a passenger railway station in the city of Tondabayashi, Osaka Prefecture, Japan, operated by the private railway company Kintetsu Railway.

Lines

Station layout
The station consists of two opposed side platforms connected to the station building by an underground passage.

Platforms

Adjacent stations

History
Tondabayashi Station opened on April 14, 1898.

Passenger statistics
In fiscal 2018, the station was used by an average of 13,577 passengers daily

Surrounding area
 Tondabayashi Jinaimachi
Tondabayashi City Central Library
 Ishikawa River Park

See also
List of railway stations in Japan

References

External links

 Tondabayashi Station  

Railway stations in Japan opened in 1898
Railway stations in Osaka Prefecture
Tondabayashi, Osaka